Solaris Pictures is an Indian film production company based in Mumbai. It was created by Sridhar Rangayan, and Saagar Gupta in 2001.  The two have gone on to create several award-winning films under Solaris Pictures' banner, focusing on LGBT issues and HIV/AIDS.

Introduction 
Solaris Pictures is an Indian film production company that has makes films covering issues such as homosexuality and gay rights. 

Previous productions include: The Pink Mirror, which has won two Best Film awards, and was screened at over 72 festivals; Yours Emotionally, which was played at several international festivals; and 68 Pages, which won the Silver Remi award at the 2008 WorldFest Houston. These films are made in a unique style that combines Bollywood melodrama with international avant-garde film techniques.

Solaris Pictures is the associate producer of Project Bolo, an Indian LGBT oral history project that interviews 20 Indian LGBT people in Mumbai, Pune, Lucknow, and New Delhi.

Solaris Pictures has produced two documentary features about the LGBTQI community in India - Purple Skies (2014) and Breaking Free (2015). 
Purple Skies highlights the stories of LBGT people victimized and subjugated by the law, the family and society, as well as stories of youngsters who have come out of the closet bravely. The film was telecast on India's National Network Doordarshan in 2015. The film screened at 27 international film festivals. 

In Breaking Free - Sec 377, filmmaker and gay activist Sridhar Rangayan exposes the human rights violations faced by the LGBTQ community in India due to a draconian law Section 377, and homophobic social mores of a patriarchal society. It won the Barbara Gittings Human Rights Award at qFLIX Philadelphia in 2016. [3] 

The company has also collaborated in producing more than 100 hours of television content for serials like Rishtey, Gubbare, Kagaar and has produced advertising for companies like Life Insurance Corporation of India, H & R Johnson, Godrej, Rupa, Zee TV. Thei social awareness films and spots for the National Institute for Hearing Handicapped, Cancer Patients Aid Association and Cama & Albless Hospital have been telecast on both DD National and Mumbai Doordarshan. 

Solaris Pictures is one of the principal organizers of Kashish Mumbai Queer Film Festival that was first held in April 2010 in Mumbai at PVR Cinemas and Alliance Francaise and then in 2011 and 2012 at Cinemax Versova and Alliance Francaise. 

Solaris Pictures has also organized Flashpoint Human Rights Film Festival in Mumbai and New Delhi in 2010/2011 and 2011/2012.

Movies

Evening Shadows
Drama/ 102 mins / India / 2018 / Hindi with English subtitles
Directed by Sridhar Rangayan
Written by: Sridhar Rangayan & Saagar Gupta 
Producer: Solaris Pictures

Evening Shadows - In a small town in Southern India that lives within a cocoon of traditions and social morality, when a young gay man Kartik (Devansh Doshi), comes out to his mother Vasudha (Mona Ambegaonkar), her entire world comes crashing down. She has no one to turn to dispel her fears and doubts, to understand her loving son’s truth. Moreover as a woman, trapped within a patriarchal conservative society, her biggest challenge is to deal with her dogmatic husband Damodar (Ananth Narayan Mahadevan), and the conservative society around her. Evening Shadows is a universal story about a mother-son bonding and its emotional strength to withstand the ravages of time and harsh realities.{ Source: imdb} 

The film has won 19 awards and screened at 72 international film festivals. It is currently streaming on Netflix.

Breaking Free
Documentary/ 82 mins / India / 2015 / English, Hindi subtitles
Directed by Sridhar Rangayan
Written by: Sridhar Rangayan & Saagar Gupta 
Producer: Solaris Pictures

Breaking Free – Sec 377 is a 2015 movie directed by Sridhar Rangayan and produced by Solaris Pictures. In this documentary, filmmaker and gay activist Sridhar Rangayan embarks on a personal journey to expose the human rights violations faced by the LGBTQ community in India due to a draconian law Section 377 and homophobic social mores of a patriarchal society.
The film was selected to be part of the Indian Panorama (non-Fiction) and screened at International Film Festival of India in 2015.

It won the Rajat Kamal National Award for Best Editing (Non-Fiction) in 2016 for its editors Pravin Angre and Sridhar Rangayan. It also won the Barbara Gittings Human Rights Award at qFLIX Philadelphia in 2016. 
It is currently streaming on Netflix.

Purple Skies
Documentary/ 66 mins / India / 2014 / English, Hindi subtitles
Directed by Sridhar Rangayan
Written by: Sridhar Rangayan & Saagar Gupta 
Producer: Public Service Broadcasting Trust and Solaris Pictures

Purple Skies is a 2014 movie directed by Sridhar Rangayan and produced by Public Service Broadcasting Trust and Solaris Pictures. It documents the opinions of lesbians, bisexuals and trans men in India. It was also broadcast on Doordarshan in 2015.

The documentary film showcases stories of the LGBT community about living in India and is the first documentary on LGBT topics to be screened on a national network, Doordarshan. As of 2015, it has been screened at 27 international film festivals.

68 Pages
Drama/ 90 mins / India / 2007 / Hindi with English subtitles
Directed and Written by Sridhar Rangayan
Producer: Humsafar Trust 
Associate Producer: Solaris Pictures

Coming from a country like India that is still in denial, where being HIV+ is still a curse, 68 Pages rips open the underbelly of its society to reveal how it stigmatizes and shuns those who are HIV+ or even those who just want to be what they are. Through 68 Pages of a counselors diary, we see the stories of Paayal, a sex worker; Nishit, an ID user; Kiran, a gay man and Umrao, a transsexual bar dancer - their stories of pain and fear, humiliation and rejection - not only by the society, but even by their loved ones. While these stories expose the shallowness of the system, it also offers hope and healing by trying to bring about a better understanding of their fight to live with dignity. The film is a tribute to the human spirit of optimism and survival. { Source: imdb}

Yours Emotionally

Drama/Gay / 86 mins / UK-India / 2006
Directed and Written by Sridhar Rangayan
Producer: Wise Thoughts (UK)
Associate Producer: Solaris Pictures (India)

Two Brits, Ravi and Paul travel to India where they meet Murthy and Anna an older gay couple that have managed to form a partnership and live together for over 20 years. When Ravi meets and falls for Mani an Indian national who is betrothed to be married. He turns to the older couple for advise and help but traditions die hard in India. {Source: imdb}

The Pink Mirror

Drama/Gay /40 mins / India / 2003 / Hindi wst English
Directed and Written by Sridhar Rangayan
Produced by Solaris Pictures (India)

The Pink Mirror pits two Indian drag queens against a westernized gay teenager in a battle to woo a handsome hunk. It's a clash of the east and west. The drag queens, who are expert in the art of seduction with their wit, innuendo and cunning or the young teenager who is saucy, slutty and sly? Underneath the campy humorous exterior, the film is an exploration of the Indian gay landscape and understanding of the deep, humanly tender bondings that exist between drag queens in India who form unique, non-patriarchal families. Using the Bollywood soap idiom of song, dance and drama and for the first time in the Indian drag queens' very own language, Hindi, the film also explores other veiled issues related to the Indian gay community: the lurking threat of HIV/AIDS. {Source: imdb} 
The film is screening on Netflix

Awards 

Solaris Pictures' films and television projects have won several awards, both Indian and international.
 Silver Remi Award at WorldFest 2008, Houston (for film "68 Pages")
 Jury Award for Best Film at ‘Fire Island Film Festival 2004, New York, USA (for film “Gulabi Aaina)
 Best Film of the Festival award at ‘Question de Genre’ film festival 2003, Lille, France
(for film “Gulabi Aaina)
 RAPA award for Best Comedy Episode, 1999 (for “Piya Ka Ghar” – Gubbare, Zee TV)
 RAPA award for Best Telefilm, 2000  (for “Khamoshiyaan” – Rishtey, Zee TV)

References

External links
 Official site
 imdb

Mass media companies established in 1991
Hindi cinema
LGBT in India
LGBT arts organizations
Film production companies based in Mumbai
1991 establishments in Maharashtra
Indian companies established in 1991